Nakhon Si Thammarat National Museum is a museum located on Rachadamnoen Road in the town of Nakhon Si Thammarat, Nakhon Si Thammarat Province in southern Thailand. At the centre of the museum is the 9th century statue of Vishnu in the Pala style of southern India. It was found in the base of a tree in Kapong district near Takua Pa in Phang Nga Province, then a major transit point for Indians colonizing the south.

Two bronze drums made by the Dong Son peoples of northern Vietnam are another display in the museum. The Thai gallery displays religious art from Dvaravati and Srivijayan periods to the Rattanakosin era. Various images of Buddha exist in the displays made in the distinctive local Sing style, characterized by stumpy features and animated faces.

The museum was opened in 1974 and covers the area of the former temple Wat Suan Luang Tawan Ok.

Literature 

Nakhon Si Thammarat
National museums of Thailand
Museums established in 1974
Religious museums in Thailand
Buildings and structures in Nakhon Si Thammarat province
Tourist attractions in Nakhon Si Thammarat province
1974 establishments in Thailand